Kim Du-chun is a paralympic athlete from South Korea competing mainly in category C6 sprint events.

Kim competed in four Paralympics winning six medals including four gold.  He first competed in the 1988 Summer Paralympics where he finished fifth in the 100m, fourth in the 200m and fifth in the 400m.  At the 1992 Summer Paralympics in Barcelona he finished second in the 100m behind the world record equalling run of American Larry Banks, and won gold in the 200m and 400m where he set a new Paralympic games record.  In the 1996 Summer Paralympics he retained his title in the 400m in a new world record and despite American Freeman Register setting a new world record in the heats of the 100m, Kim beat him in the final to win the Gold medal but he was only able to win the bronze in the 200m.  His final games came in 2000 where he finished sixth in the 100m, fourth in the 200m and 400m.

References

External links
 

Year of birth missing (living people)
Living people
South Korean male sprinters
Paralympic athletes of South Korea
Paralympic gold medalists for South Korea
Paralympic silver medalists for South Korea
Paralympic bronze medalists for South Korea
Paralympic medalists in athletics (track and field)
Athletes (track and field) at the 1988 Summer Paralympics
Athletes (track and field) at the 1992 Summer Paralympics
Athletes (track and field) at the 1996 Summer Paralympics
Athletes (track and field) at the 2000 Summer Paralympics
Medalists at the 1992 Summer Paralympics
Medalists at the 1996 Summer Paralympics
20th-century South Korean people